Enics is an Electronics Manufacturing Services (EMS) provider that specializes in industrial electronics.

Enics is headquartered in Zürich, Switzerland and employs over 3,000 people in 8 manufacturing plants in Europe and Asia.

Enics provides development, support, prototyping, industrialization, manufacturing, product care, spare part
production, and repair and maintenance services for the entire life-cycle of its customers’ products.

Enics is ranked number 30 on Manufacturing Market Insider's list of the top 50 EMS providers in
the world. and is considered one of the largest EMS providers in Europe. Enics has been a member of the United Nations Global Compact since December
2011.

Enics offers the following services: Engineering (electronics design support, NPI, fast prototyping, design for manufacturing, test system development), manufacturing (PCB assembly, box build and
system assembly, low-volume production, RoHS services), life extension (component and product care, test system maintenance), after sales (spare parts production, electronics repair, preventive maintenance, recycling services), and supply chain (sourcing, optimization of supply chain, delivery
flexibility).

Operations/Locations 
Enics has 7 production plants in:
 China (Beijing and Suzhou)
 Malaysia (Johor Bahru)
 Estonia (Elva)
 Finland (Lohja)
 Slovakia (Nová Dubnica)
 Sweden (Västerås)

History 
Enics was formed in 2004 as a result of a management buyout of Elcoteq's Industrial Electronics Division. During that same year the company started a new production plant in Elva, located in Southern Estonia, where Enics is the largest employer.

In 2005 Enics acquired Altronix, a part of ABB Västerås’ operations, 2 Flextronics plants in Sweden, Enermet's Jyskä's operations in Finland, and assets from Elcoteq in China. In 2006 Enics’ Beijing facility was officially inaugurated, the 3rd extension in Enics Estonia was completed, and the takeover of activities from ABB Switzerland was finished. Enics acquired assets in Nová Dubnica, Slovakia in 2007. In February 2008 the company established the Enics Hong Kong Sourcing Office and one year later, in February 2009, it acquired the Industrial Electronics Service Unit from Sweco, Finland. In November 2011 Enics signed an agreement for a new facility in Suzhou, China which began operations in May 2012. In June 2020 Enics announced and began construction of a new manufacturing site in Johor Bahru, Malaysia, that started production in early 2021.

On June 22, 2022, Enics announced they would be merging with another equally sized European electronics manufacturing services provider, GPV. The new combined company will be one of Europe's largest EMS companies with 7,500 employees and a revenue of more than 941 million euros. The merger is subject to regulatory review.

Structure 
Enics is a group of electronics manufacturing services (EMS) companies; Enics AG is the parent company of the Enics Group and it owns 100% of its subsidiaries Enics Schweiz AG, Enics Finland Oy, Enics Sweden AB, Enics Eesti AS, Enics Electronics (Beijing) Ltd, Enics Slovakia s.r.o., Enics Hong Kong Ltd, Enics Electronics (Suzhou) Ltd, Enics Malaysia SDN. BHD. and Enics Raahe Oy, together with its wholly owned subsidiary EKC Electronics (Suzhou) Co., Ltd.

The main owner of the company is Ahlström Capital.

Awards 
Enics’ subsidiary, Enics Eesti, AS, received an award level in the Estonian Sustainable Business Index in 2007 and 2009.

The Ministry of Education and Research of Estonia recognized Enics Eesti as the most education friendly organization of the year in 2014

External links

References 

Electronics companies of Switzerland
Manufacturing companies based in Zürich